Hellas SC is an amateur soccer club based in Winnipeg, Manitoba. The club plays in the Manitoba Major Soccer League.

They won the Manitoba Soccer Association Cup in 2008, 2009 and 2022, as well as the Canadian National Challenge Cup in 2009.

Players

2009 Challenge Cup Roster 

Source: last updated 2011-Oct-17 Official Roster and nationalities from Hellas-SC.com Roster

Year by year

References

External links 
 

Soccer clubs in Winnipeg
1974 establishments in Manitoba
Association football clubs established in 1974